Eudromia  is a genus of birds in the tinamou family. This genus comprises two crested members of this South American family.

Etymology
Eudromia comes from two Greek words, eu meaning well or nicely, and dromos meaning a running escape. These definitions together mean, nice running escape, which refers to their habit of escaping predators by running.

Taxonomy
Tinamous are paleognaths related to the flightless ratites. They are probably close in appearance to the flying ancestors of the ratites. Unlike other ratites, tinamous can fly, although in general, they are not strong fliers.

This genus has a mere 2 species, but the elegant crested tinamou has diversified into a considerable number of subspecies:

The species are:

Extant Species

Fossils
†Eudromia sp. (Late Miocene of La Pampa Province, Argentina)
†E. olsoni Tambussi & Tonni 1985 [Tinamisornis intermedius Dabbene & Lillo 1913 non Rovereto 1914; Eudromia elegans intermedia (Dabbene & Lillo 1913)] (Late Pliocene of Buenos Aires Province, Argentina)
†E. intermedia (Rovereto 1914) [Tinamisornis intermedia Rovereto 1914 non Dabbene & Lillo 1913] (Pliocene of Argentina) 

MPLK-03, a fossil specimen from Argentina, possibly belongs to Eudromia and surpacces extanct E. elegans and E. formosa in size by 2.2-8% and 6-14%, respectively. It existed during the Late Pleistocene, around the time of the Last Glacial Maximum.

Footnotes

References

External links

 ITIS

 
Bird genera